McCluggage is a surname. Notable people with the surname include:

Andy McCluggage (1900–1954), Irish footballer
Denise McCluggage (born 1927), American racing driver
Hugh McCluggage (born 1998), Australian rules footballer
Kerry McCluggage (born 1954), American television executive